Apterygothrips is a genus of thrips in the family Phlaeothripidae.

Species
 Apterygothrips australis
 Apterygothrips banyan
 Apterygothrips bicolor
 Apterygothrips bournieri
 Apterygothrips brunneicornis
 Apterygothrips canarius
 Apterygothrips caricis
 Apterygothrips dempax
 Apterygothrips flavus
 Apterygothrips floridensis
 Apterygothrips fungosus
 Apterygothrips fuscus
 Apterygothrips gilvipes
 Apterygothrips grassoi
 Apterygothrips haloxyli
 Apterygothrips hispanicus
 Apterygothrips jenseri
 Apterygothrips jogensis
 Apterygothrips kohai
 Apterygothrips longiceps
 Apterygothrips nakaharai
 Apterygothrips neovulcaniensis
 Apterygothrips okajimai
 Apterygothrips pellucidus
 Apterygothrips perplexus
 Apterygothrips piceatus
 Apterygothrips pinicolus
 Apterygothrips pitkini
 Apterygothrips politus
 Apterygothrips priesneri
 Apterygothrips remotus
 Apterygothrips robustus
 Apterygothrips rubiginosus
 Apterygothrips semiflavus
 Apterygothrips sparsus
 Apterygothrips vesmanisae
 Apterygothrips viretum
 Apterygothrips wollastoni
 Apterygothrips zelkovae
 Apterygothrips zempoalensis

References

Phlaeothripidae
Thrips
Thrips genera